The Jerusalem Institute of Justice (JIJ) is a nonprofit human rights organization operating in Israel. JIJ advocates human rights and civil justice, advocates in the Courts of Israel, the Israeli Knesset, international governments, academia and mainstream media forums in Israel and across the globe. The institute assists weakened populations, such as Holocaust survivors, women, men and children that are trapped in the sex industry, IDF soldiers with no homes or families, and religious and ethnic minority groups. 
The Institute was founded in 2004 and since then has handled over 1000 cases dealing with religious freedom in Israel.

Areas of operation

Human rights advocacy 
 
JIJ has Special Consultative Status at the United Nations ECOSOC which provides the organization with the opportunity to be heard by a global audience and directly contribute to international humanitarian law.
Members of the institute have lobbied before the European Parliament, the UN Human Rights Council, as well as the parliaments of Finland, Sweden, Switzerland and France, petitioning them to reconsider what was perceived by JIJ members as irresponsible policies of funding the Palestinian Authority. Furthermore, JIJ conducted research and interviews and drafted in-depth reports on human rights abuses committed by the Palestinian Authority and Hamas. The findings were submitted to several leading international bodies as well as different universities around the world, among which are Oxford, MIT, Toronto University, University of California Berkeley, Helsinki University, Uppsala University and many others.

Assisting weakened populations 

The Jerusalem Institute of Justice provides assistance to IDF lone soldiers. Lone soldiers are young men and women who have no family support or a place to return to over weekends; most of these soldiers stay in "soldier homes" provided by the IDF. JIJ provides weekly Shabbat meals, holiday celebrations, additional humanitarian assistance as well as leisure activities.  JIJ secured a positive decision at the Knesset to significantly improve the living conditions of Lone Soldiers in Israel.

JIJ offers humanitarian as well as legal assistance to Holocaust survivors, individuals of Ethiopian descent, and other populations in need.

Combatting prostitution and human trafficking 

The Jerusalem Institute of Justice is promoting an anti-prostitution bill based on the Nordic Model in Israel. This will criminalize the clients of the sex industry and stop the abuse of the people trapped in prostitution. JIJ is part of the "Coalition for Combating Prostitution and Human Trafficking" and has an ongoing presence in the Knesset Subcommittee for combating human trafficking and prostitution. JIJ conducts extensive online campaigns to change Israeli ideas on issues regarding human dignity and prostitution, as well as working in partnerships with schools. 

In August 2016, JIJ was a main partner in arranging a memorial protest rally in Tel-Aviv, which called for the implementation of the Nordic Model and for the criminalization of prostitution in Israel. The rally took place in front of a strip club in the city.

Ethnic and religious equality 

The Jerusalem Institute of Justice has  handled over 1000 legal cases to date and has won 24 petitions before the Israeli Supreme Court, handling issues of family reunification, citizenship and more. 
In 2012 the Jerusalem Institute of Justice petitioned the Israeli High Court of Justice to overturn Amendment 17, a law passed in 2010 granting synagogues a 100% exemption on municipal property taxes on the grounds that the exclusive application of the amendment to synagogues was undemocratic. Due to JIJ's petition, on August 2, 2012, the Knesset officially extended Amendment 17 to include all houses of worship and religious studies.

Internship and research 

The Jerusalem Institute of Justice has an active internship program with on average 40 interns a year. The interns come to Israel from different parts of the world, and engage in the institute's activity in different areas, from social media management, legal and political research to monitoring hostile activities online as well as offline.

References

Human rights organizations based in Israel
Jewish organizations based in Israel
Legal organizations based in Israel
Law firms established in 2004
Anti-discrimination law in Israel